The Bennington Battle Monument is a  stone obelisk located at 15 Monument Circle, in Bennington, Vermont, United States.  The monument commemorates the Battle of Bennington during the American Revolutionary War.

In that battle, on 16 August 1777, Brigadier General John Stark and 1,400 New Hampshire men, aided by Colonels Warner and Herrick of Vermont, Simonds of Massachusetts, and Moses Nichols of New Hampshire, defeated two detachments of General John Burgoyne's British army, who were seeking to capture a store of weapons and food maintained where the monument now stands.

In 1877, a local historical society began to plan a monument for the battle's centenary, and considered many designs. The committee eventually accepted J. Phillip Rinn's design with some changes. The monument's cornerstone was laid in 1887, and it was completed in November 1889 at a total cost of $112,000 (including the site). It is constructed of Sandy Hill Dolomite from present day Hudson Falls, New York, a blue-gray magnesian limestone containing numerous fossils. Dedication ceremonies were delayed until 1891, when President Benjamin Harrison attended the ceremonies and held a reception at the nearby Walloomsac Inn. Today the Bennington Battle Monument is a Vermont State Historic Site.

A kettle captured from General Burgoyne's camp at Saratoga is visible in the monument along with a diorama of the second engagement, and information on how the monument was built. Statues of John Stark ("Live free or die"), Seth Warner, and other notables ornament the grounds.

The monument, while  from the relevant battlefield, is located very close to what was once the site of the Catamount Tavern, where Ethan Allen and the Green Mountain Boys planned the capture of Fort Ticonderoga in 1775.

Gallery

See also 

 Bennington Battlefield
 Saratoga Battle Monument
 USS Bennington Monument
 Fort Rosecrans National Cemetery
 National Register of Historic Places listings in Bennington County, Vermont

References

External links 

 Vermont Historic Sites: Bennington Battle Monument
 Bennington.com: The Bennington Monument

American Revolutionary War monuments and memorials
Buildings and structures in Bennington, Vermont
Obelisks in the United States
Vermont culture
Vermont State Historic Sites
Monuments and memorials in Vermont
Monuments and memorials on the National Register of Historic Places in Vermont
American Revolutionary War sites
Tourist attractions in Bennington County, Vermont
1889 sculptures
Buildings and structures completed in 1889
Limestone sculptures in Vermont
National Register of Historic Places in Bennington County, Vermont
Historic district contributing properties in Vermont
Outdoor sculptures in Vermont